Pradhan Khunta is a village in Baliapur CD Block in Dhanbad subdivision of Dhanbad district in the Indian state of Jharkhand.

Geography
The Dhangi Hills (highest peak 385.57 m) run from Pradhan Khunta to Gobindpur.

Demographics
As per the 2011 Census of India, Pradhan Khunta had a total population of 4,399 of which 2,274 (52%) were males and 2,125 (48%) were females. Population below 6 years was 587. The total number of literates in Pradhan Khunta was 2,930 (76.86% of the population over 6 years).

Transport
The Asansol-Gaya section, a part of the Grand Chord, passes through this block. There is a station at Pradhan Khunta on this line.

Deuli-Khairpal Road passes through Pradhan Khunta and links it to NH 19, Baliapur and Sindri.

References

Villages in Dhanbad district